Voice of the Heart is the posthumous eleventh studio album by American pop duo Carpenters. It was released in 1983 after Karen's death and contains the two songs from her final recording sessions, "Now" and "You're Enough", as well as previously unreleased tracks from sessions of their previous albums A Kind of Hush, Passage and Made in America. At least one song, "In Love Alone", was intended to be on this album, but Karen did not get the opportunity to hear the track or record a vocal for it before her death; it would be released in 1987 on Richard's solo album Time with Dionne Warwick on lead vocals.

Karen's last recording, "Now", was recorded in April 1982 while Karen was taking a break from medical treatment in New York and had temporarily returned to California. The song was recorded in one take.

The tracks were finished by Richard months after Karen's death.

Track listing

Singles
"Make Believe It's Your First Time"
US 7" single (1983) – A&M 2585
1. "Make Believe It's Your First Time"
2. "Look to Your Dreams"

BR 7" single (1983) – CBS 47075
1. "Make Believe It's Your First Time"
2. "Look to Your Dreams"

"Your Baby Doesn't Love You Anymore"
US 7" single (1984) – A&M 2620
1. "Your Baby Doesn't Love You Anymore"
2. "Sailing on the Tide"

Charts and certifications

Weekly charts

Certifications

References

The Carpenters albums
1983 albums
A&M Records albums
Albums recorded at Capitol Studios
Albums published posthumously
Albums recorded at A&M Studios